Huglfing station is a railway station in the municipality of Huglfing, in Bavaria, Germany. It is located on the Munich–Garmisch-Partenkirchen railway of Deutsche Bahn.

Services
 the following services stop at Huglfing:

References

External links
 
 Huglfing layout 
 

Railway stations in Bavaria
Buildings and structures in Weilheim-Schongau